Nu går den på Dagmar is a Danish 1972 film written and directed by .

Cast 

Claus Ryskjær

Klaus Pagh
Erling Schroeder
Jørgen Ryg
Flemming Quist Møller
Gabriel Axel
Lily Broberg
Judy Gringer
Willy Rathnov
Preben Mahrt
Ove Sprogøe
Sisse Reingaard

References

External links 
 
 

1972 films
Danish comedy films
1970s Danish-language films
Films directed by Henning Ørnbak